Robinvale Sport Field is a small stadium in the Robinvale district of Atlantis, a town located 40 km north of Cape Town in South Africa. In 2011 it became the new home venue of Jomo Powers F.C., playing in the Western Cape province of Vodacom League.

Soccer venues in South Africa
Sports venues in the Western Cape